Circle Green is an unincorporated community in Jefferson County, in the U.S. state of Ohio.

History
The Circle Green post office closed in 1907. Besides the post office, Circle Green had a Methodist Episcopal church, established in 1809.

References

Unincorporated communities in Jefferson County, Ohio
Unincorporated communities in Ohio